The Gezhouba Dam or Gezhouba Water Control Project on the Yangtze River is located in the western suburbs of Yichang, in central China's Hubei province. One of the largest run-of-the-river dams, it sits several kilometers upstream from downtown Yichang, just downstream of the fall of the Huangbo River into the Yangtze. Construction started on December 30, 1970 and ended on December 10, 1988.

Two small islands, Gezhouba and Xiba, divided the river into three channels. There the Gezhouba Project was built.

The facility boasts a generating capacity of  along with three ship locks, two power stations that generate  of electricity annually. It has 27 gates of spillway, and a non-flowing Dam on both banks.

The navigation lock  on the third channel was, when built, among the 100 largest in the world. It provides passage for 10,000 ton ships.

The construction of the Gezhouba Dam, and others on the Yangtze, is considered by scientists to be one of the main causes of the decline and extinction of the Chinese paddlefish.

See also 

 List of power stations in China

References

External links 

 Pictures of Gezhouba Dam & Gezhouba Shiplock 
 Hubei: Gezhouba Water Control Project
 China News: Gezhouba Dam

Hydroelectric power stations in Hubei
Yichang
Dams completed in 1988
Dams on the Yangtze River
Locks of China
1988 establishments in China
Energy infrastructure completed in 1988
Gravity dams